Ram Bharose is a 1977 Bollywood Action comedy film Produced by Subhash Sagar and directed by Anand Sagar.Music score by Ravindra Jain.

Cast
Randhir Kapoor as Rampratap
Rekha as Kiran
Amjad Khan as Bhanupratap
Madan Puri as Boss
Sujit Kumar as David
Raza Murad as Shekhar (Kiran's Brother)
Dara Singh as Sardar Vikram Singh (CBI Agent No. 1007)
Kanan Kaushal as Kamal (Bhanupratap Wife)
Nazir Hussain as Ratanchand 
Tom Alter as Tom
M. B. Shetty as Jaggu

Music
Music is composed by Ravindra Jain who also wrote the songs, along with fellow lyricists Hasrat Jaipuri, Tajdar Taj and Dev Kohli.

External links
 

1977 films
Films scored by Nashad
1970s Hindi-language films
1977 comedy films
Films scored by Ravindra Jain
Films set in Nepal
Films shot in Kathmandu
Films shot in Nepal